Sharon Butala  (born Sharon Annette LeBlanc, 1940 in Nipawin, Saskatchewan) is a Canadian writer and novelist.

Life
Butala was born in an outpost hospital in Nipawin, Saskatchewan. She was the second of five daughters born to Amy Graham and Achille LeBlanc, who ran a sawmill near Garrick, Saskatchewan. In 1946 her family moved to the French-Canadian town of St. Louis, Saskatchewan, and moved again when she was thirteen years old to the city of Saskatoon, Saskatchewan. She attended the University of Saskatchewan obtaining both a Bachelor of Arts degree and a Bachelor of Education degree. Between her third and fourth year of university she married for the first time. This marriage lasted 14 years, and her son, Sean Hoy, was born during this time.

After graduating she taught English in Saskatchewan and British Columbia and also taught in a special program for the YMCA in Halifax, Nova Scotia. In 1969 she returned to Saskatoon and worked in special education at Princess Alexandra School. In 1972 she returned to the University of Saskatchewan to work on a post-graduate diploma in education and began teaching for the College of Education.

By 1975 she was divorced and working on her Master of Education degree with a budding academic career when she met Peter Butala. She abandoned her degree, and they were married on May 21, 1976, after which she moved to his ranch near Eastend, Saskatchewan. It was here that she began writing seriously, and this environment became the setting of much of her writing. Her first book, Country of the Heart, was published in 1984 and was shortlisted for the Books in Canada First Novel Award.

As head of the Eastend Arts Council she spearheaded the creation of the Wallace Stegner House Residence for Artists in which Wallace Stegner's childhood home was turned into a retreat for writers and artists. She lived near Eastend until 14 months after Peter's death in 2007. She now lives in Calgary, Alberta.

She was shortlisted for the Governor General's award three times, once for fiction for Queen of the Headaches, and twice for nonfiction, for The Perfection of the Morning and Where I Live Now. The Fall 2012 issue of Prairie Fire, entitled The Visionary Art of Sharon Butala  was dedicated to Butala and her work and influence. She and her husband, Peter Butala, were also involved in the creation of the Old Man on His Back Prairie and Heritage Conservation Area. The Butala homestead is now the interpretive centre for this area of original and restored mixed grass prairie.

Awards
 Marian Engel Award (1998)
 Officer of the Order of Canada (2001)
 Honorary Doctor of Laws, University of Regina (2000)
 Honorary Doctor of Letters, University of Saskatchewan (2004)
 Honorary Doctor of Letters, University of Alberta (2013)
 Saskatchewan Order of Merit (2009)
 Cheryl and Henry Kloppenburg Award for Literary Excellence. (2012)
 Five Conservation Awards

Works

Fiction
Fever, HarperCollins, 1990
Upstream, Fifth House, 1991; HarperCollins, 1996
Country of the Heart, Fifth House, 1984; HarperCollins, 1999
The Fourth Archangel, HarperCollins, 1992
Luna, HarperPerennial Canada, 1994
Queen of the Headaches, Coteau Books, 1994 (nominated for a Governor General's Award)
The Gates of the Sun, HarperCollins, 2001
The Garden of Eden, HarperFlamingo Canada- A Phyllis Bruce Book, 2002
Real Life, HarperFlamingo Canada – A Phyllis Bruce Book, 2002
Wild Rose, Coteau Books, 2015
Zara's Dead, Coteau Books, 2018
Season of Fury and Wonder, 2019 (winner of the 2019 W.O. Mitchell City of Calgary Book Award)

Non-fiction
Harvest, Fifth House, 1992
The Perfection of the Morning: An Apprenticeship in Nature, HarperCollins, 1994 (nominated for a Governor General's Award)
Coyote's Morning Cry: Meditations & Dreams From a Life in Nature, HarperCollins, 1995
Wild Stone Heart: An Apprenticeship in the Fields, HarperFlamingo Canada, 2000
Old Man on His Back: Portrait of a Prairie Landscape, HarperCollins – A Phyllis Bruce Book, 2002 (with Courtney Milne)
Lilac Moon, HarperPerennial – A Phyllis Bruce Book, 2005 (winner of the 2005 Saskatchewan Book Award for non-fiction)
The Girl in Saskatoon: A Meditation on Friendship, Memory and Murder, HarperCollins – A Phyllis Bruce Book, 2008
Where I Live Now: A Journey through Love and Loss to Healing and Hope, Simon & Schuster, 2017 (nominated for a Governor General's Award)
This Strange Visible Air: Essays on Aging and the Writing Life, Freehand Books, 2021

References

External links
 Western American Literature Journal: Sharon Butala 
 2008 Interview at books site Pickle Me This
 SharonButala.com

1940 births
Living people
Officers of the Order of Canada
Canadian women novelists
People from Nipawin, Saskatchewan
Writers from Saskatchewan
Writers from Calgary
University of Saskatchewan alumni
Franco-Albertan people
Fransaskois people
20th-century Canadian novelists
21st-century Canadian novelists
20th-century Canadian women writers
21st-century Canadian women writers